John Bennett (born January 19, 1950) is an American former professional ice hockey left winger. He played 34 games for the Philadelphia Blazers in 1972 and 1973. His father Harvey Bennett Sr. and three of his brothers (Harvey Bennett Jr., Curt Bennett, and Bill Bennett) are also former major league pro hockey players. Bennett played in the 1961 and 1962 Quebec International Pee-Wee Hockey Tournaments with the Cranston team.

References

External links

American men's ice hockey left wingers
Brown Bears men's ice hockey players
Ice hockey players from Rhode Island
Philadelphia Blazers players
Roanoke Valley Rebels (EHL) players
Sportspeople from Cranston, Rhode Island
1950 births
Living people